Tanes Ongjunta (born 18 July 1992), better known by his ring name Jomwo Kor.Saklamphun, Jomwo Kelasport, is a Thai professional boxer, who has held the WBA Asia flyweight title since 2021.

As an amateur, Ongjunta medaled twice at the Southeast Asian Games, winning a silver medal as a bantamweight in 2015 and a silver medal as a flyweight in 2017.

Personal life

Ongjunta also trains people in treatment for substance abuse at Siam Rehab in Chiang Rai as well as holds regular free training sessions for underprivileged youth in his home gym in Mai Sai, Chiang Rai.

Amateur boxing career

Southeast Asian Games
Ongjunta represented Thailand at the 2015 Southeast Asian Games, held in June 2015, once again competing in the bantamweight division. He beat Rafli Langi by unanimous decision in the opening round of the tournament, Arfiqanie Ahmad Anshori by unanimous decision in the quarterfinals and Muhamad Ridhwan by unanimous decision in the finals, which earned him a place in the tournament finals. Ongjunta faced Mario Fernandez in the finals, which were held on 10 June 2015. He lost the fight by a second-round technical knockout.

Ongjunta competed in the flyweight event of the 2017 Southeast Asian Games, held in August 2017 at the Malaysia International Trade and Exhibition Centre MITEC. He won the quarterfinal bout against Hang Hamorn and semifinal bout against Ian Clark Bautista by unanimous decision, but lost the final bout against Aldoms Suguro by split decision.

Invitational tournaments
Ongjunta participated in the 2015 Thailand International Invitational Boxing Tournament, as a replacement for Donchai Thathi. He moved up in weight to bantamweight (-56 kg) for this tournament. He won the gold medal after beating Lanhai Xiao by unanimous decision in the opening round on 4 April 2015, Almas Zhakypov by unanimous decision in the semifinals on 6 April 2015 and Javier Ibanez by unanimous decision in the finals on 7 April 2015.

Ongjunta moved back down to flyweight to compete in the 2016 Olympic qualifying event in Baku. Although he was able to win his first two fights, against Syed Muhammad Asif and Murtadha Al Sudani by unanimous decision, he eventually lost to Kharkhuu Enkhamar in the tournament quarterfinals. As such, he was unable to participate in the 2016 Olympic Games.

Ongjunta competed in the flyweight event of the 2016 FISU World University Boxing Championships, held in October 2016. He secured Thailand's fourth gold medal, after beating Subaru Murata, Chingiz Natyrov and Malik Nahim by unanimous decision.

Ongjunta took part in the flyweight event of the 2017 Thailand International Invitational Tournament. He won the opening round bout against Gandulam Mungunerdene by split decision, and beat Ian Clark Bautista by points in the quarterfinals and Jasurbek Latipov by split decision in the semifinals. Ongjunta secured the gold medal after beating Frank Zaldivar by a majority decision in the finals.

Professional boxing career
Ongjunta made his professional debut against fellow debutante Watcharin Ontong on 12 October 2019. He won the fight by a first-round knockout. He amassed a 4–0 record during the next 20 days, with two victories coming by way of stoppage. Ongjunta was scheduled to fight Adrian Lerasan for the vacant WBA super-flyweight title on 1 March 2020, in his fifth professional bout. He lost the fight by an eight-round technical knockout.

After beating Pakphum Tawinram by a first-round technical knockout in a super-flyweight bout on 28 November 2020 and Khachonsak Pothong by a third-round technical knockout in a bantamweight bout on 19 December 2020, Ongjunta moved down to flyweight to face Suriyan Satorn for the vacant WBA Asia flyweight title on 27 March 2021. He won the fight by unanimous decision, with scores of 99–91, 100-90 and 100–90. Ongjunta made his first title defense against Lerdchai Chaiyawed on 27 November 2021. He won the fight by unanimous decision, with all three judges scoring the bout 100–90 in his favor.

Ongjunta made his second WBA Asia flyweight title defense against Jakrawut Majungoen on 7 May 2022. He won the fight by a sixth-round technical knockout. Ongjunta made his third WBA Asia title defense against Jeny Boy Boca on 6 August 2022. He retained the title by unanimous decision, with scores of 98–92, 96–94 and 99–91.

Professional boxing record

Exhibition boxing record

References

1992 births
Living people
Tanes Ongjunta
Tanes Ongjunta
Flyweight boxers
Super-flyweight boxers
Bantamweight boxers
Competitors at the 2015 Southeast Asian Games
Competitors at the 2017 Southeast Asian Games
Tanes Ongjunta
Southeast Asian Games medalists in boxing